Nicholas J Melas Centennial Fountain is located on the north bank of the Chicago River at McClurg Court in Near North Side, Chicago. It was dedicated in 1989, to celebrate the 100th anniversary of the Metropolitan Water Reclamation District of Greater Chicago, perhaps best known for its major achievement in reversing the flow of the Chicago River in 1900; and in 1999, this system was named a "Civil Engineering Monument of the Millennium" by the American Society of Civil Engineers (ASCE).

History 
As the Metropolitan Water Reclamation District of Chicago was soon to celebrate its 100-year anniversary, its architects came up with building a fountain along the Chicago River. They designed a fountain that includes a sculptural sun dial along the side of the river. The fountain was opened in 1989. 

The fountain was named after Nicholas J. Melas who was elected in 1962 to the district's Board of Commissioners. Melas was re-elected five times, serving for thirty years; the last eighteen as President of the Board.

The fountain's controls were damaged by flooding in May 2020, and work to refurbish the fountain began in 2022.

Features 
The fountain designed by Lohan Associates, every hour, on the hour, shoots a large eighty-foot  water arc across the river from a modernist tiered waterfall. The waterfall and the water cannon both operate from 8:00am to 11:00pm every day in the warm months.

References

External links 
 Metropolitan Water Reclamation District 
 Nicholas J. Melas Centennial Plaza and Fountain — Chicago Public Art

Buildings and structures in Chicago
Central Chicago
Fountains in Illinois